Dominik Henzel (born July 7, 1964) is a Czech-born Swedish actor and comedian. He has starred in at least 18 Swedish films and television series during a career that began in 1979.  Henzel has also appeared in a number of television commercials and works as a stand-up comedian.

Early life
Henzel was born on 7 July 1964 in Prague, Czechoslovakia.

Career
Henzel is best known for his role as "Sudden" in the teen film G – som i gemenskap (1983). Besides his film roles he has appeared in several commercials for chips and sunglasses.

He has done stand-up comedy for audiences as large as 1,500 people and has participated several times on the television comedy show Raw Comedy Club, broadcast on Kanal5. He also appeared in season two of the comedy series Solsidan, broadcast on TV4.

Family
He is the older brother of Patrik Henzel of the Swedish synthpop band NASA.

Filmography
Source:

1979 – Fjortonårslandet
1981 – Veckan då Roger dödades
1982 – Avgörandet
1983 – G - Som i gemenskap
1984 – Splittring
1987 – Mr Big
1988 – Ingen kan älska som vi
1989 – The Resurrection of Michael Myers Part 2
2001 – Brudlopp
2004 – Spung
2005 – Supersnällasilversara och Stålhenrik
2005 – Kommissionen
2005 – Kvalster
2006 – Lilla Jönssonligan & stjärnkuppen
2007 – Playa del Sol
2011 – Solsidan
2012 – Dance Music Now
2013 – Allt faller

References

External links

Official website

Living people
1964 births
Swedish male television actors
Swedish male comedians
Male actors from Prague
Czechoslovak emigrants to Sweden
Swedish male film actors
Swedish stand-up comedians
20th-century Swedish comedians
21st-century Swedish comedians